The 1989 BP National Championships was a men's tennis tournament played on outdoor hard courts in Wellington, New Zealand and was part of the 1989 Nabisco Grand Prix. It was the 2nd edition of the tournament and was held from 2 January through 8 January 1989. Eighth-seeded Kelly Evernden won the singles title.

Finals

Singles

 Kelly Evernden defeated  Shuzo Matsuoka 7–5, 6–1, 6–4
 It was Evernden's 1st singles title of the year and the 3rd of his career.

Doubles

 'Peter Doohan /  Laurie Warder defeated  Rill Baxter /  Glenn Michibata 3–6, 6–2, 6–3
 It was Doohan's only title of the year and the 6th of his career. It was Warder's only title of the year and the 6th of his career.

See also
 1989 Fernleaf Classic – women's tournament

References

External links
 ITF tournament edition details

BP National Championships
BP National Championships
January 1989 sports events in New Zealand
1980s in Wellington
BP